is a combined athletic and football stadium in Maebashi, Gunma, Japan.

External links
  

Football venues in Japan
Sports venues in Gunma Prefecture
Maebashi